Innocent Meeting is a 1958 British crime film directed by Godfrey Grayson and starring Sean Lynch, Beth Rogan and Raymond Huntley. In the film, a teenager on probation for theft bonds with the daughter of middle-class parents after meeting her in a record shop. The screenplay, written by Brian Clemens, centres on the boy’s conflicted reaction when he is suspected of another robbery.

Cast
 Sean Lynch - Johnny Brent
 Beth Rogan - Connie
 Raymond Huntley - Harold
 Ian Fleming - Garside
 Howard Lang - Macey
 Arnold Bell - Fry
 Colin Tapley - Stannard
 Robert Raglan - Martin
 Denis Shaw - Uncle
 Hal Osmond - Shopkeeper

References

External links

1958 films
1958 crime films
Films directed by Godfrey Grayson
British crime films
1950s English-language films
1950s British films